Kazem Kola (also Romanized as Kāz̧em Kolā) is a village in Langarud Rural District, Salman Shahr District, Abbasabad County, Mazandaran Province, Iran. At the 2006 census, its population was 495, in 140 families.

References 

Populated places in Abbasabad County